Bazaria fulvofasciata is a species of snout moth in the genus Bazaria. It was described by Rothschild in 1915. It is found in Algeria.

References

Moths described in 1915
Phycitini
Endemic fauna of Algeria
Moths of Africa